Van Gent is a Dutch toponymic surname indicating an origin in the city Ghent, East Flanders. A variant spelling is Van Ghent. People with this name include:

Eugene Van Gent (1889–1949), American college football and basketball coach
Hendrik van Gent (c.1217–1293), Flemish theologian
Hendrik van Gent (1899–1947), Dutch astronomer
Van Gent (crater), lunar crater named for the astronomer
1666 van Gent, asteroid discovered by Hendrik van Gent
Henk van Gent (born 1951), Dutch competitive sailor
Ineke van Gent (born 1957), Dutch GreenLeft politician
Jan van Gent (1340–1399), Dutch name of John of Gaunt, 1st Duke of Lancaster, born in Ghent
Joris van Gent (fl. 1552-1577) or Joris van Straeten, a Flemish portrait and history painter from Ghent
Justus van Gent or Joos van Ghent (c.1410–1480), Early Netherlandish painter 
Maarten van Gent (born 1947), Dutch basketball coach, scout and businessman
 (c.1470–1512), Flemish sculptor active in Portugal
Pieter van Gent (c.1480–1572), Flemish missionary in Mexico known there as Pedro de Gante
Willem Joseph van Ghent (1626–1672), Dutch admiral

See also
Van Gendt, Dutch surname referring to Gendt, Gelderland
Jan-van-gent, Dutch name for the Northern gannet
Sas van Gent, town in the Dutch province of Zeeland on the border with Belgium
Van Gend & Loos, Dutch distribution company established by Jan-Baptist van Gend (1772–1831)
Gazette van Ghendt, 18th-century newspaper in Ghent
HNLMS Van Ghent (1926), Royal Netherlands Navy destroyer named after Willem Joseph van Ghent

References

Dutch-language surnames
Toponymic surnames